The 1991 Australian Touring Car season was the 32nd year of touring car racing in Australia since the first runnings of the Australian Touring Car Championship and the fore-runner of the present day Bathurst 1000, the Armstrong 500.

There were 12 touring car race meetings held during 1991; a nine-round series, the 1991 Australian Touring Car Championship (ATCC); a support programme event at the 1991 Australian Grand Prix and two long distance races, nicknamed 'enduros' which made up the 1991 Australian Endurance Championship.

Season review
1991 was the low point for Group A touring car racing in Australia as grid numbers plunged in a harsh economic climate. Just eleven cars entered the Wanneroo round of the ATCC and just fifteen started the once prestigious Sandown 500.

On track the Touring Car Championship was dominated by the Gibson Motorsport prepared Nissan Skyline GT-Rs of Jim Richards and Mark Skaife. Tony Longhursts new 2.5 litre evolution spec BMW M3 was the only car to interrupt the clean sweep. A final round DNF for Richards was not enough to take the title away, despite Skaife scoring more points over the course of the season. With only the best eight results counting Richards won the championship by five points. Gibson Motor Sport did not appear at the Sandown 500, but Nissan still won through the Bob Forbes Racing car (built by Gibson) driven by Mark Gibbs and Formula Holden ace Rohan Onslow. Richards and Skaife then swept all before them at the 1991 Tooheys 1000, establishing a race record that stood until 2010. Third placing at Bathurst gave the Australian Endurance Championship to Gibbs and Onslow.

1991 also saw Peter Brock return to driving a Holden VN Commodore after a single season driving a BMW M3 (1988) and a Ford Sierra RS500 in 1989 and 1990. Brock's Mobil 1 Racing joined forces with Perkins Engineering run by his former Bathurst 1000 co-winner Larry Perkins to run a pair of the new Group A VN Commodore's.

Results and standings

Race calendar
The 1991 Australian touring car season consisted of 12 events.

Australian Touring Car Championship

Don't Drink Drive Sandown 500

Tooheys 1000

Hush Puppies Olympic Group A Challenge 
This meeting was a support event of the 1991 Australian Grand Prix.

References

Linked articles contain additional references.

External links
 Official V8 Supercar site

Australian Touring Car Championship
Touring Cars